Anantanand Rambachan is a professor of religion at St. Olaf College.

Education
Rambachan completed his undergraduate studies at the University of the West Indies, St. Augustine, Trinidad. He received his M.A. (Distinction) and Ph.D. degrees from the University of Leeds, in the United Kingdom, where he researched "classical Advaita epistemology and, in particular, the significance of the śruti as a source of valid knowledge (pramāṇa) in Śaṅkara."

Since 1985 Rambachan has been teaching in the Department of Religion at St. Olaf College, Minnesota, USA, where he "continued my research and writing on Advaita, the Hindu tradition in a global context, Hindu ethics, Hinduism and contemporary issues and interreligious dialogue." Starting 2013, Professor Rambachan was Forum Humanum Visiting Professor at the Academy for  World Religions at Hamburg University, Germany until 2017.

Activities
Rambachan is a Professor of Religion at St. Olaf College, Minnesota, USA. He has been teaching at St. Olaf since 1985. Rambachan is a Hindu and was the first non-Christian chair of the Religion Department at this Lutheran college.  He is a member of the Theological Education Steering Committee of the American Academy of Religion, the Advisory Council of the Centre for the Study of Religion and Society, University of Victoria, BC, Canada, an advisor to Harvard University's Pluralism Project, Chair of the Board for the MN Multifaith Network, and is a member with Consultation on Population and Ethics, a non-governmental organization, affiliated with the United Nations.

Rambachan is very involved with interreligious dialogue and more specifically, Hindu-Christian dialogue. He continues to participate in  interreligious activities, both nationally and internationally. He is an active member and participant in the dialogue program of  the World Council of Churches and participated in the last four General Assemblies.

From 2013 to 2017, Rambachan published articles as an author on the Huffington Post, covering topics related to Hinduism. From 2017 on, he moved his writings to the blog portion of his website.

He has traveled and lectured in Norway, Switzerland, Germany, Australia, Mauritius, South Africa, Kenya, India, Trinidad, Brazil, The Vatican, Japan, Italy, Spain, Canada and the United Kingdom. A series of 25 lectures was broadcast internationally by the BBC. Rambachan also led the first White House celebration of the Hindu Festival of Diwali in 2003. He continues to return to Trinidad on a yearly basis and was awarded the Chaconia Gold Medal, Trinidad and Tobago's second highest national honor for public service.

Selected works

References

Sources

 National Library and Information System of Trinidad and Tobago
 St. Olaf College
 World Council of Churches Address Notification

External links

 Anantanand Rambachan at Digital Commons

Trinidad and Tobago people of Indian descent
Trinidad and Tobago expatriates in the United States
St. Olaf College faculty
Year of birth missing (living people)
Living people
Trinidad and Tobago expatriates in the United Kingdom
Alumni of the University of Leeds
University of the West Indies alumni
Harvard University people
Hindu studies scholars
Advaita Vedanta
Neo-Vedanta
American academics of Indian descent
Indian scholars